International Institute for Management Development (IMD) is a independent university institute with campuses in Lausanne, Switzerland and Singapore. For more than 75 years, IMD has been a pioneering force in developing leaders who transform organizations and contribute to society. IMD is well known for its MBA program, which is taught in English and consistently ranked among the best in the world.

IMD’s unique, department-less structure and collaborative, purpose-driven culture enables IMD faculty and staff to design and develop innovative and integrated programs addressing carefully identified needs and objectives.

IMD’s graduates go on to successful careers that have an impact on a considerable number of people, and often society at large. Generations of graduates have, in all corners of the world, married their quest for personal success with their desire to contribute to a more prosperous, sustainable and inclusive world.

The sphere of activity of those who attend IMD goes beyond business. There are contributions to societies, and in some cases to the natural environment, that go beyond the realm of commercial achievement: educating people from low-income households, creating opportunities for children with disabilities, curing illnesses, reducing pollution and waste; also nation-building, with contributions to developing technological and financial infrastructure, helping countries to move out of the low-income trap.

History and mission
IMD was formed in January 1990 through the merger of independent management education centers, established by business leaders for business leaders: The International Management Institute (Geneva) (IMI), established in 1946 by Alcan, and Institut pour l'Etude des Methodes de Direction de l'Entreprise (IMEDE) Lausanne established in 1957 by Nestlé. The new organization, the International Institute for Management Development (IMD), settled in Lausanne. The history of IMEDE and its merger with IMI is documented in Jean-Pierre Jeannet and Hein Schreuder (2015, chapters 2 and 4).  

In 2021, IMD celebrated its 75 years anniversary. To mark this special occasion, IMD published a book on its history; IMD 75 years, challenging what is, inspiring what could be.

IMD provides executive education; it is determinedly not part of a university, and there are no academic departments, just one integrated multidisciplinary faculty.  The faculty consists of 53 full-time members, made up of 17 different nationalities. Jean-François Manzoni, Nestlé Chaired Professor of IMD, is the current President of IMD.

Previous presidents have included Dominique Turpin, John R. Wells, Peter Lorange, and Juan Rada. Peter Lorange ran IMD from 1993 to 2008 and has been widely credited with having established it as one of the world's leading academic institutions.

IMD focuses on training and developing leaders. IMD tends to select experienced candidates for both the Master of Business Administration (MBA) and the Executive MBA. Its other focus is to have a broad international group of participants attending open programs to ensure that no nationality dominates. Every year, some 8,000 executives representing over 98 nationalities attend one of the programs.[citation needed]

Education
IMD’s educational offerings:

 Degree programs: the MBA, the EMBA and the MSc in Sustainable Management & Technology
 Executive programs for Individuals  
 Executive programs for Organizations  
 Online programs
 LiVe Virtual programs
 Advisory work

MBA program
The school's MBA program is a one-year full-time program. The program runs from January through December with a summer break to refresh and reflect. Each class includes around 90 participants from over 40 nationalities.

The MBA program focuses on 3 critical themes: leadership, sustainability and career. Students benefit from close contact with executives on-site given IMD has been recognized as the best business school for an open program in executive education from 2012 to 2017. Moreover, participants also enjoy several expeditions to further expand their knowledge and activate their network. Participants will learn from some of the world’s best faculty experts and influential speakers and make lifelong connections with their peers.  

Admission to the MBA program requires:

 Bachelor's degree or equivalent from an accredited institution, 
 Minimum of two years full-time, post graduate experience 
 One recommendation from a business-related source 
 GMAT/GRE: above 630 
 English proficiency

Applicants who pass the first written stage of the application process are invited for an online or in person interview, a further assessment, an elevator pitch, a team experience, class observation (where possible) and networking with members of the MBA team.

In 2022, IMD celebrated its 50 years anniversary of its MBA program. The MBA programs were introduced at IMEDE in 1972 and CEI/IMI in 1978.  

On 8 October 2022, IMD marked this anniversary with a celebratory event on the Lausanne campus with the launch of a book; 50 for 50 – Inspiring leadership journeys from half a century of the IMD MBA, looking back over the last 50 years and looking forward to the future.

EMBA program
The curriculum of the EMBA is different from the MBA because it targets experienced managers with at least 10 years of experience who seek to strengthen their careers without leaving their jobs. The average class size is around 55 participants of more than 40 nationalities. The IMD Executive MBA is a modular program consisting of a Foundation Stage and a Mastery Stage. Altogether the program takes over one year.

Supporting their growth as a leader, passionate faculty share their knowledge, resources and contacts in discovery modules around the globe. Participants also travel to exciting global destinations to build critical skills in entrepreneurship, innovation, impact investing and much more, experiencing environments that will have the biggest impact on your learning and development.

Master of Science in Sustainable Management and Technology 
The Master of Science in Sustainable Management and Technology program is offered by Enterprise for Society (E4S) on behalf of its three partner institutions: the University of Lausanne (UNIL), the Institute for Management Development (IMD), and the École Polytechnique Fédérale de Lausanne (EPFL)

The 2-year program aims at building competences along three dimensions: technology and innovation, economics and management, and sustainability. Participants in the program learn how to lead teams across multiple disciplines and solve complex problems in corporations, start-ups and NGOs.

The program is intended for holders of a Bachelor degree with little or no professional experience and will bring together students with either an engineering profile or management/economics profile.

Research 
IMD has an established, international reputation for producing research and thought leadership that is rigorous, relevant, insightful and actionable.

This makes IMD’s output highly sought after by business executives in all sectors of the global economy as well as its business school and university peers across the world.

Case studies 
IMD’s case writing is globally renowned for its excellence, quality, innovation, and insight.

Cases written by IMD faculty members are regularly recognized as award-winning case studies and best-selling case studies.

Publishing 
Books

IMD works with publishing houses and self-publishes books as well.

The books written by IMD’s world renowned faculty members are recognized in book award competitions every year.  

I by IMD

I by IMD offers first-person business intelligence from the brightest thinkers in academia, business and society. Written by experts for experts, I by IMD is a platform for debate on the latest issues in management, strategy, technology, finance, team building and innovation.

The I by IMD magazine is published quarterly by IMD.

Accreditations & labels 
IMD is accredited by the Swiss Accreditation Council as a university institute. Since 2004, IMD has sustained the premier triple accreditation by AACSB, AMBA, and EFMD(EQUIS).

The Institute also holds an EcoVadis gold medal, the EFMD Business School Impact System label, and ISO 27001 Information Security Management and ISO 27701 Privacy Management certifications.

Ranking 
IMD is one of just two business schools worldwide that has been ranked in the top five of the Financial Times Executive Education Rankings for more than 15 consecutive years.   

Executive Education Rankings

 #2 worldwide for open programs – 2022 (Financial Times)
 #1 worldwide for open programs for nine years in a row – 2012-2020 (Financial Times)

MBA rankings

 #1 MBA international 1-year program – 2019 (Forbes)

 #1 MBA program in Europe – 2022-2023 (Bloomberg Businessweek)
 #1 MBA program worldwide for criteria on international students; international faculty - 2022 (Financial Times)
 #4 Best International MBA programs-2021-2022 (Poets & Quants)

EMBA rankings

 #1 EMBA program worldwide for criteria on international faculty; languages – 2022 (Financial Times)
 #6 in international students
 #2 in work experience

Executive education participants
IMD counts 125’000+ alumnis across 140 countries and 80+ industries. 
Bappaditya Basu: Chief Business Officer, ANAROCK, INDIA
Svein Aaser: Former CEO, DnB NOR
Matti Alahuhta: CEO, Kone Corporation
Ole Andersen: Chairman, Bang & Olufsen
Bjarni Ármannsson: CEO, Glitnir Bank, Iceland
Jon Fredrik Baksaas: President and CEO, Telenor
Paul Bulcke: Former CEO, Nestlé
Harsh Goenka: Indian billionaire and Chairman, RPG Enterprises
Oswald Grübel: Former CEO, UBS
Carla De Geyseleer, CFO, Volvo Cars
Philipp Humm: Former CEO, T-Mobile USA
Tarang Jain, Indian billionaire
Susanne Klatten: Member of the Board, BMW
Gerard Kleisterlee: Chairman Vodafone; Former CEO, Royal Philips Electronics
Kjeld Kirk Kristiansen: Former President and CEO, The Lego Group
Abba Kyari: Chief of Staff to the President of Nigeria from August 2015 to April 2020
Christoph Loos, CEO, Hilti
Jay Mehta, Chairman, Mehta Group
Milinda Moragoda: Sri Lankan Cabinet Minister of Justice, Law Reform and MP
Thomas Oetterli, CEO, Schindler Group
Mark Opzoomer: CEO, Rambler Media
Michael Patsalos-Fox: Former Chairman, Americas, McKinsey & Company
Prince Pieter-Christiaan of Orange-Nassau, van Vollenhoven, Netherlands
Mark Rutte: Prime Minister, Netherlands
Thomas Schmidheiny: Chairman, Holcim
Søren Skou: Group CEO, A.P. Moller - Maersk
Ian Charles Stewart: Founder, WiRed
Diego Molano Vega: Former Minister of Information Technologies and Communications, Colombia
Peter Voser: Chairman and CEO, ABB, Former CEO Royal Dutch Shell

Faculty
 Darcy C. Coyle
 Dominique Turpin
 George Kohlrieser
 Howard Yu
 Jean-Francois Manzoni
 Paul Strebel
 Samuel Bendahan

Partnerships 
IMD has partnerships with

 MIT Sloan School of Management 
 Ecole Polytechnique Fédérale de Lausanne 
 University of Lausanne 
 Yale School of Management 
 Porto Business School  

 Waseda University 
 Ecole cantonale d’art de Lausanne

See also 
 Swiss Finance Institute
 HEC Lausanne
 École Polytechnique Fédérale de Lausanne

References

External links
 Information's about the International Institute for Management Development
 IMD – International Institute for Management Development, A-Z Business Schools, independent.co.uk
 International Academy of Sports Science and Technology (AISTS)

International Institute for Management Development
Educational institutions established in 1990
Organisations based in Lausanne
1990 establishments in Switzerland